Surabaya Stock Exchange (SSX) (Indonesian: Bursa Efek Surabaya (BES)) was a stock exchange that officially opened on June 16, 1989, based on the Minister of Finance Decree of Indonesia No. 654/KMK.010/1989 with only thirty-six shareholders. It was established in order to support the Indonesian government in capital markets and economic development in the East Region of Indonesia.

History
Surabaya Stock Exchange was originally opened in 1925 during the Dutch colonial era, but it was closed in early 1939 due to the ongoing World War II. On 16 June 1989, the exchange restarted the operation.

On 22 July 1995, the SSX merged with the Indonesian Parallel Stock Exchange (IPSX), leaving only two primary exchanges operating in Indonesia.

On 30 October 2007, SSX was officially merged to Jakarta Stock Exchange (JSX) and becoming Indonesia Stock Exchange (IDX) as a single exchange operating in Indonesia, besides Jakarta Futures Exchange.

Products
SSX trades various products, including:
 Equities (stock)
 Bonds (Government Bonds and Corporate Bonds)
 Derivatives products (Japan Futures, LQ45 Futures, and Mini LQ45 Futures)

See also
 Indonesia Stock Exchange
 Jakarta Stock Exchange

References

Indonesia Stock Exchange
Stock exchanges in Indonesia
Economy of Indonesia
Financial services companies established in 1989
Financial services companies disestablished in 2007
Defunct stock exchanges